‘Abd al-Mu‘īn ibn Musā‘id ibn Sa‘īd was a sharif of the Zayd clan who briefly served as Sharif and Emir of Mecca on two occasions – first in January 1788, and second during April–July 1803.

He succeeded to the Emirate in January 1788 after the death of his brother Sharif Surur, but he abdicated to his brother Sharif Ghalib within a few days. He assisted Ghalib during his rule, leading several military expeditions against the Saudi-Wahhabi Emirate of Diriyah. In April 1803 when Wahhabi forces marched on Mecca, Ghalib appointed Abd al-Mu'in as acting Emir before retreating to Jeddah. Abd al-Mu'in surrendered the city to Saud ibn Abd al-Aziz and was installed as Emir under Saudi suzerainty. In July 1803 he allowed Sharif Ghalib to enter the city with his army and drive out the Wahhabi garrison.

Notes

References

18th-century Arabs
Sharifs of Mecca
Dhawu Zayd